Farie Hoti Sports Palace is a multi-use sports arena in Tirana, Albania. It is the home of SK Tirana, where KB Tirana, KB Tirana women, KV Tirana and KV Tirana women play their home games. It is named after Farie Hoti, who played for KV Tirana women.

References

Indoor arenas in Albania
Basketball venues in Albania
Sports venues in Albania
Indoor track and field venues
Buildings and structures in Tirana
Sports venues completed in 2013